An anti-hijack system is an electronic system fitted to motor vehicles to deter criminals from hijacking them. Although these types of systems are becoming more common on newer cars, they have not caused a decrease in insurance premiums as they are not as widely known as other more common anti-theft systems such as alarms or steering locks. It can also be a part of an alarm or immobiliser system. An approved anti-hijacking system will achieve a safe, quick shutdown of the vehicle it is attached to. There are also mechanical anti-hijack devices. 

Diversify Solutions, a company in South Africa, has announced its research and development at the Nelson Mandela University of a GSM based Anti hijacking system.  

The system works off a verification process with added features such as alcohol sensors and signal jamming capabilities, this comes after increasing rates of hijackings in South Africa and alarming rates of accidents caused by driving under the influence and texting whilst driving.

Technology 
There are three basic principles on which the systems work.

Lockout 
A lockout system is armed when the driver turns the ignition key to the on position and carries out a specified action, usually flicking a hidden switch or depressing the brake pedal twice. It is activated when the vehicle drops below a certain speed or becomes stationary, and will cause all of the vehicles doors to automatically lock, to prevent against thieves stealing the vehicle when it is stopped, for example at a traffic light or pedestrian crossing.

Transponder 
A transponder system is a system which is always armed until a device, usually a small RFID transponder, enters the vehicle's transmitter radius. Since the device is carried by the driver, usually in their wallet or pocket, if the driver leaves the immediate vicinity of the vehicle, so will the transponder, causing the system to assume the vehicle has been hijacked and disable it. 

As the transponder itself is concealed, the thief would not be aware that such a system is active on a vehicle until they had ejected the driver and moved the vehicle out of range of the driver (usually only a couple of meters). This is probably the most common anti-hijack system, and a central locking system that uses the same concept was demonstrated by Jeremy Clarkson on an old episode of the BBC Top Gear program where he teased a butler by asking him to put his bags in a Mercedes-Benz S600 but didn't give him the RFID transponder. The butler was confused when the S600 doors wouldn't open when he tried, but when Jeremy approached with the transponder in his pocket, the system acknowledged this and unlocked the car, allowing Jeremy to simply pull the door handle to gain entry to the vehicle.

Microswitch 
A microswitch system is always armed and is usually activated if one of the vehicle doors is opened and closed again while the vehicle's engine is running. Once the system has been activated, the driver will have a set time limit to disarm it by entering a code before the vehicle takes measures. 

If the system is not disarmed in the time window, it will warn the driver by sounding the vehicle's horn once every 10 seconds for 30 seconds, at which point the system will start sounding the horn at much shorter intervals and will usually activate the vehicle's hazard lights. 

At this point the immobiliser circuit will also start rapidly pulsing for 40 seconds, completely disabling the engine and eventually bringing the vehicle to a stop. If the thief switches the ignition to the off position and back to the on position again, the horn will restart and operate constantly and the hazard lights will flash for 60 seconds. 

The immobiliser circuit will close for 15 seconds and will rapidly pulse for 15 seconds before re-opening the circuit, allowing the vehicle to be driven to a safe location before once again being immobilised. The hazard lights will continue to flash, and on every subsequent attempt to start the vehicle will cause the horn to operate for 30 seconds, but the immobilizer circuit will not open, so the vehicle will not start and the hazard lights will keep flashing until the vehicle's battery is drained or the system is disarmed.

Mechanical anti-hijack devices 
Blocks steering shaft rotation and prevent rotation of the steering wheel. When set mechanical anti-hijack device the wheels do not turn and the car can travel only straight forward and backward. Or in the side back and forth, before installing the mechanical anti-hijack device lock if the wheels turn. To go by car to the established mechanical anti-hijack device is not possible.

See also 
 Immobilisers
 Car alarms
 Vehicle tracking systems
 Blaster (flamethrower)

References

External links 
Information and photo, mechanicals anti-hijack devices on cars
Automotive accessories
Crime prevention
Embedded systems
Access control
Hijacking
Vehicle security systems